Sakala is a surname with multiple origins. Notable people with the surname include:

 Alcides Sakala Simões (born 1953), Angolan politician
 Benson Sakala (born 1996), Zambian footballer
 Christina Sakala (born 1993), Zambian model
 Evans Sakala (born 1970), Zambian footballer
 Filip Sakala (born 1996), Czech ski jumper
 Henry Joe Sakala, Zambian actor and filmmaker
 Jaroslav Sakala (born 1969), Czech ski jumper
 Saith Sakala (born 1996), Zambian footballer
 Thomas Zondo Sakala (born 1955), Zimbabwean economist

See also
 

Zambian surnames